Kigo or KIGO may mean one of the following

Places
 Kigo, Uganda, a neighborhood in Ssabagabo Municipality, Wakiso District, Uganda.

In Japanese language
 Kigo, a word or phrase associated with a particular season, used in traditional forms of Japanese poetry.

Radio stations
 KIGO, a radio station in St. Anthony, Idaho, United States.